Roderick Phelps (born 1934) is a former Australian rugby union player. He played fullback, wing and centre and debuted for The Wallabies against New Zealand in the 2nd Test at Dunedin in 1955. He toured New Zealand and South Africa and went on the 1957–58 Australia rugby union tour of Britain, Ireland and France, playing 23 Tests for Australia between 1955 and 1962.

References 

Living people
Australian rugby union players
1934 births
People educated at North Sydney Boys High School
Australia international rugby union players
Rugby union centres
Rugby union players from Sydney